Hooge (16 April 1609 – 4 May 1648), formally known as Prince Su, was a Manchu prince of the Qing dynasty. He was the eldest son of Hong Taiji, the second ruler of the Qing dynasty.

Life
Hooge was born in the Aisin Gioro clan as the eldest son of Hong Taiji, the second ruler of the Qing dynasty. His mother was Lady Ula Nara, one of Hong Taiji's consorts.

Hooge participated in military campaigns against the Mongols, Koreans and the Ming dynasty. After Hong Taiji's death in 1643, Hooge and his uncle Dorgon fought over the succession to the throne. The situation was to Hooge's advantage because three of the Eight Banners previously under Hong Taiji's control had been passed on to him. On the other hand, Dorgon had the support of his brothers and two White Banners. This meant that the remaining two Red Banners controlled by Daišan and his son, as well as the Bordered Blue Banner under Chiurhala, were crucial to ensuring that Hooge could win the succession. After much dispute, Daišan started favouring Hooge, who ostensibly refused to take the throne. Hooge was actually waiting for others to urge him to take the throne, so that he could sit on it without projecting a power-hungry image of himself. Unfortunately for Hooge, Dorgon and his brothers gave way, so the conflict continued without a solution. The power struggle concluded with a compromise in order to avoid internal strife. Dorgon nominated Fulin, another son of Hong Taiji born to Consort Zhuang, to be the new ruler, so Fulin ascended to the throne as the Shunzhi Emperor.

Even after the Shunzhi Emperor came to power, there was still much friction between Hooge and Dorgon. According to popular belief, Hooge had conceived a scheme to seize the throne from the Shunzhi Emperor, but he leaked out his plan to Dorgon's brother Dodo, who informed Dorgon about it. Dorgon then used this as an excuse to have Hooge arrested and thrown into prison. However historical records state that Hooge was imprisoned after the Qing government launched military campaigns against remnant rebel forces in western China, and he died during his incarceration. He was posthumously rehabilitated in 1650, two years after his death.

Family 
Primary Consort

 First primary consort, of the Hada Nara clan (嫡福晉 哈達那拉氏; d. 1636)
 Second primary consort, of the Khorchin Borjigit clan (繼福晉 博爾濟吉特氏), personal name Duleima (杜勒瑪)
 Fushou, Prince Xianque of the First Rank (顯愨親王 富綬; 2 July 1643 – 11 January 1670), fourth son

Secondary Consort

 Secondary consort, of the Nara clan (側福晉 那拉氏)
 Third daughter (8 June 1638 – February/March 1646)

 Secondary consort, of the Shuolongwu clan (側福晉 碩隆武氏)
 Lady of the First Rank (郡君; 29 September 1636 – November/December 1680), second daughter
 Princess of the Third Rank (郡主; 8 September 1638 – July/August 1652), fifth daughter
 Mengguan, Prince Wenliang of the Second Rank (溫良郡王 猛瓘; 21 December 1643 – 12 August 1674), fifth son

Concubine

 Mistress, of the Gūwalgiya clan (瓜爾佳氏)
 First daughter (14 September 1631 – April/May 1692)

 Mistress, of the Nara clan (那拉氏)
 Qizheng'e (齊正額; 16 November 1634 – March/April 1677), first son

 Mistress, of the Huang clan (黃氏; d. 1648)
 Gutai, General of the Second Rank (輔國將軍 固泰; 13 March 1638 – 18 August 1701), second son
 Wohena, General of the Second Rank (輔國將軍 握赫納; 7 March 1639 – 24 October 1662), third son
 Lady of the First Rank (郡君; 22 August 1641 – June/July 1703), seventh daughter
 Married Geng Jingzhong (1644–1682) in October/November 1659

 Mistress, of the Wang clan (王氏)
 Fourth daughter (2 September 1638 – August/September 1667)

 Mistress, of the Niu clan (牛氏)
 Sixth daughter (19 November 1638 – November/December 1693)
 Tenth daughter (24 June 1646 – June/July 1677)

 Mistress, of the Sirin Gioro clan (西林覺羅氏)
 Eighth daughter (3 November 1641 – March/April 1703)
 Ninth daughter (25 October 1644 – January/February 1661)

 Mistress, of the Ningguta clan (寧古塔氏)
 Xingbao (星保; 26 December 1643 – 16 May 1686), sixth son

 Mistress, of the Irgen Gioro clan (伊爾根覺羅氏)
 Shushu (舒書; 22 February 1645 – 2 November 1685), seventh son

 Mistress, of the Sirin Gioro clan (西林覺羅氏)
 11th daughter (22 October 1646 – December 1692 or January 1693)

Ancestry

See also
 Prince Su
 Prince Wen
 Royal and noble ranks of the Qing dynasty
 Ranks of imperial consorts in China#Qing

References

 
 

Qing dynasty imperial princes
Deliberative Princes and Ministers
1609 births
1648 deaths
Prince Su
Hong Taiji's sons